The 1975 North Rhine-Westphalia state election was held on 4 May 1975 to elect the 8th Landtag of North Rhine-Westphalia. The outgoing government was a coalition of the Social Democratic Party (SPD) and Free Democratic Party (FDP) led by Minister-President Heinz Kühn.

The opposition Christian Democratic Union (CDU) remained the largest party and improved its lead over the SPD, but failed to win an overall majority. The incumbent coalition retained the 105-seat majority it had won at the previous election, with a net shift of three seats from the SPD to the FDP. Turnout increased dramatically to 86.1%, the highest ever recorded in the state. The SPD–FDP coalition was renewed and Heinz Kühn was re-elected as Minister-President by the Landtag on 4 June.

Electoral system
The Landtag was elected via mixed-member proportional representation. 150 members were elected in single-member constituencies via first-past-the-post voting, and fifty then allocated using compensatory proportional representation. A single ballot was used for both. An electoral threshold of 5% of valid votes is applied to the Landtag; parties that fall below this threshold are ineligible to receive seats.

Background

In the previous election held on 14 June 1970, the CDU returned as the largest party with a narrow one-seat lead over the SPD. The SPD and FDP both suffered losses, but retained a small majority. The governing coalition between the two was subsequently renewed.

Parties
The table below lists parties represented in the 7th Landtag of North Rhine-Westphalia.

Results

External links

References

Elections in North Rhine-Westphalia